Mandingo Central Mosque is a large mosque located in Freetown, Sierra Leone. It is one of the largest mosque in Sierra Leone and is located in the neighborhood of Magazine Court in the East End of Freetown. The chief Imam of the Mandingo Central Mosque is  Sheikh Alhaji Abubakarr Swarray. 

The mosque was built to primarily serve members of the Mandingo people of Sierra Leone, although other muslims from different ethnic groups are welcome to pray and worship at the mosque. 

The spiritual and tribal leader of the Sierra Leonean Mandingo is Chief Alhaji Alimamy Samba Demba Tarawallie, who is also a member of the mosque 

Former Sierra Leone"s president 
Ahmad Tejan Kabbah was a regular member of the Mandingo Central Mosque and he usually prayed at the Mandingo Central Mosque during and after his presidency.  President  Kabbah"s funeral prayer was held at the Mandingo Central Mosque.

Other famous members of the Mandingo Central Mosque include former Sierra Leone Minister of Trade Usman Boie Kamara.

See also
 Islam in Sierra Leone

External links
 

Buildings and structures in Freetown
Mandinka
Mosques in Sierra Leone